David Anthony Yallop (27 January 1937 – 23 August 2018) was a British author who wrote chiefly about unsolved crimes. In the 1970s, he contributed scripts for a number of BBC comedy shows. In the same decade he also wrote 10 episodes for the ITV court drama, Crown Court.

His controversial book, In God's Name: An Investigation Into the Murder of Pope John Paul I (1984), posited that Pope John Paul I, found dead at age 65 in his chambers barely a month after becoming pope in 1978, had been poisoned by secretive Masons who had infiltrated the Vatican and the Vatican Bank. Reviewers, and the Church, dismissed the book as groundless conspiracy theory. The book made the New York Times Best Seller list for 15 weeks, was translated into multiple languages, and was repeatedly reprinted, selling over six million copies.

In October 1992 he lost his job when, as a scriptwriter for EastEnders, he proposed killing some of the characters by means of an IRA bomb. Yallop successfully sued the BBC for breach of contract. He was also one of the co-authors of Graham Chapman's autobiography, A Liar's Autobiography (Volume VI).

Yallop described himself as a "Catholic agnostic".

Yallop suffered from Alzheimer's disease in his later years. He died aged 81 in London on 23 August 2018, leaving a widow (his second wife, Anna Rutherford), three daughters, and a son. The cause of death was complications of pneumonia.

Books
His books include:

To Encourage The Others (about the Craig/Bentley murder case)
The Day The Laughter Stopped (a biography of Roscoe "Fatty" Arbuckle)
Beyond Reasonable Doubt? (the conviction of New Zealand farmer Arthur Allan Thomas (later pardoned), for the murder of Harvey and Jeannette Crewe) was made into a docu-drama feature film, 1978, 
Deliver Us From Evil (about the Yorkshire Ripper)
In God's Name: An Investigation into the Murder of Pope John Paul I, Bantam Books, 1984
To the Ends of the Earth (about the capture of Carlos the Jackal)
How They Stole the Game (about corruption in football)
Unholy Alliance (about the international drug trade and resultant political corruption)
The Power and the Glory: Inside the Dark Heart of Pope John Paul II's Vatican (about the Papacy of Pope John Paul II)
Beyond Belief (about the sexual abuse allegations in the Catholic Church)
Ratlines (about how Nazis escaped with the help of the Vatican)

References

External links
 

1937 births
2018 deaths
British agnostics
British non-fiction writers
Former Roman Catholics
British crime journalists
British dramatists and playwrights
British male dramatists and playwrights
People from London
Critics of the Catholic Church
Male non-fiction writers
Deaths from pneumonia in England
Neurological disease deaths in England
Deaths from Alzheimer's disease